Fort Snelling is a historic military fortification the U.S. state of Minnesota.

Fort Snelling may also refer to:

Places
 Fort Snelling (unorganized territory), Minnesota
 Fort Snelling National Cemetery
 Fort Snelling State Park
 Fort Snelling station

Ships
 USS Fort Snelling, several ships of the United States Navy